Computational methods exploit the sequence signatures of disorder to predict whether a protein is disordered, given its amino acid sequence. The table below, which was originally adapted from and has been recently updated, shows the main features of software for disorder prediction. Note that different software use different definitions of disorder.

Methods not available anymore:

References

External links
 Curated list of ~40 disorder prediction programs

Structural bioinformatics software
Protein structure
Proteomics